Pagyda botydalis is a moth in the family Crambidae. It was described by Snellen in 1880. It is found on Sumatra, in north-eastern India, Sri Lanka, Taiwan, Papua New Guinea and Australia, where it has been recorded from Queensland.

Adults have yellow wings with orange lines.

References

Moths described in 1880
Pyraustinae